In analytical geometry , a transcendental curve is a curve that is not an algebraic curve. Here for a curve, C, what matters is the point set (typically in the plane) underlying C, not a given parametrisation. For example, the unit circle is an algebraic curve (pedantically, the real points of such a curve); the usual parametrisation by trigonometric functions may involve those transcendental functions, but certainly the unit circle is defined by a polynomial equation. (The same remark applies to elliptic curves and elliptic functions; and in fact to curves of genus > 1 and automorphic functions.)

The properties of algebraic curves, such as Bézout's theorem, give rise to criteria for showing curves actually are transcendental. For example an algebraic curve C either meets a given line L in a finite number of points, or possibly contains all of L. Thus a curve intersecting any line in an infinite number of points, while not containing it, must be transcendental. This applies not just to sinusoidal curves, therefore; but to large classes of curves showing oscillations.

The term is originally attributed to Leibniz.

Further examples 
 Cycloid
 Trigonometric functions
 Logarithmic and exponential functions
 Archimedes' spiral
 Logarithmic spiral
 Catenary
 Tricomplex cosexponential

References

Curves

ru:Кривая#Трансцендентные кривые